Edge is a 2015 television pilot produced by Amazon Studios. It is a Western set in Kansas based on the Edge book series by George G. Gilman.

Premise 
Josiah Hedges, also known as Edge, is a half-Mexican hired gunslinger who sets out for vengeance after his younger brother is killed by a group of his former comrades in the Union Army. The group is led by Edge's nemesis, Merritt Harknett, a psychotic sadist who delights in inflicting pain on others and who also seeks something in Edge's possession.

Cast
Max Martini as Edge
Ryan Kwanten as Harknett
Yvonne Strahovski as Beth
Alicja Bachleda as Pilar
William Sadler as Big Bill
Beau Knapp as Little Bill
Robert Bailey, Jr. as Benny
Noah Segan as Deputy Bean
Jerry Vahn Knight as Young Josiah Hedges
Alex Sawunyama as Young Benny
Nate Warren as Jamie Hedges
Leo Martini as Young Jamie Hedges
Christopher Hagen as Preacher
Dylan Kenin as Deputy Trickett
Kevin Owen McDonald as Cyrus
Chad Randall as Graves
William Paul Brown as Cobb
Jacob Browne as Benny's Father
Nathaniel Augustson as Union Guard
Eva Dolezalova as Annie

Production
Edge was released as a pilot for a potential TV series but was not picked up by Amazon.

Reception
In general, critics appreciated the action and effects of the pilot but were critical of the writing and story.

Robert Lloyd of the Los Angeles Times called the action "well staged" but called the film an uncomfortable combination in which the supposedly realistic brutality "is contradicted by the super-anti-heroic invincibility of its death-dealing central character."

Neil Genzlinger of The New York Times called it "an ultraviolent western that starts out with promise but degenerates into gore for gore's sake." He further wrote that the only reason to produce something so over the top "is to appeal to bloodlust" and that "by the pilot's end, it barely matters who is killing whom or why."

Barry Lowry of Variety.com wrote that "too much of the writing misses the bull's-eye."

References

External links
 

2015 television films
2015 Western (genre) films
Films directed by Shane Black
Films scored by Brian Tyler
Films set in Kansas
Films with screenplays by Shane Black
Television pilots not picked up as a series
Television series by Amazon Studios
American Western (genre) television films
2015 films
2010s English-language films